West Side Leadership Academy is a four-year (9-12) public school of the Gary Community School Corporation in Gary, Indiana, United States.

Notable alumni
 Jason Johnson, former NFL player
 Jon'Vea Johnson, NFL player
 Lonnie Johnson Jr., NFL player
 Brandon Moore, former NFL player

See also
 List of high schools in Indiana

References

External links
West Side High School Official Site

Public high schools in Indiana
Schools in Gary, Indiana
Educational institutions established in 1968